1804 was the 18th season of cricket in England since the foundation of Marylebone Cricket Club (MCC). The first Eton v Harrow match may have been played at Lord's Old Ground.

Honours
 Most runs – Lord Frederick Beauclerk 258 (HS 94)
 Most wickets – Lord Frederick Beauclerk 17

Events
 According to a Harrovian who played in the 1805 Eton v Harrow match, the fixture also took place in 1804 with Harrow winning.
 With the Napoleonic War continuing, loss of investment and manpower impacted cricket and only 5 first-class matches have been recorded in 1804:
 18–20 June: MCC v All-England @ Lord's Old Ground
 27–28 June: MCC and Homerton v Hampshire @ Lord's Old Ground
 2 July: MCC v All-England @ Lord's Old Ground
 9 July: All-England v Surrey @ Lord's Old Ground
 23–24 July: MCC v All-England @ Lord's Old Ground

Debutants
1804 debutants included:
 Richard Beckett (MCC; amateur)
 Samuel Bridger (Surrey)
 Felix Ladbroke (MCC; amateur)
 Thomas Vigne (Surrey; amateur)
 John Pontifex
 Henry Bentley

References

Bibliography

Further reading
 
 
 
 
 Britcher, Samuel, A list of all the principal Matches of Cricket that have been played (1790 to 1805), annual series
 

1804 in English cricket
English cricket seasons in the 19th century